is a Japanese manga artist, most noted for the manga Revolutionary Girl Utena. In 1996, she received the Shogakukan Manga Award for shōjo for Kanon. She is part of the Be-Papas manga artist collective.

Her debut work was "Ken to Madomoaseru" (The Sword and the Mademoiselle) in 1982. Her hobbies are dance, music, opera, and sumo.

Works 
 Anastasia Club (2001-2008)
 (1990)
 (1992)
 (1994)
 (1995)

 (1996 – 1997)

 (''Published in 2 English Short Story Volumes by Tokyopop")

References

External links 
PRISMS - Saitou Chiho manga database fan site entry 
 
Romance Symphony of Saito Chiho

 
1967 births
Japanese graphic novelists
Living people
Manga artists from Tokyo